Malaya Mezhenka is a rural locality (a khutor) in Yevstratovskoye Rural Settlement, Rossoshansky District, Voronezh Oblast, Russia. The population was 211 as of 2010.

Geography 
Malaya Mezhenka is located 19 km southeast of Rossosh (the district's administrative centre) by road. Yevstratovka is the nearest rural locality.

References 

Rural localities in Rossoshansky District